The 2012–13 VCU Rams men's basketball team represented Virginia Commonwealth University during the 2012–13 NCAA Division I men's basketball season. It was the 45th season of the University fielding a men's basketball program. Led by fourth-year head coach Shaka Smart, they played their home games at the Stuart C. Siegel Center. This was the Rams inaugural season in the Atlantic 10 Conference (A10), after spending the past 17 years in the Colonial Athletic Association (CAA). They finished the season 27–9, 12–4 in A10 play to finish in second place. They advanced to the championship game of the 2013 Atlantic 10 tournament where they lost to Saint Louis. They received an at-large bid to the 2013 NCAA tournament, their third straight NCAA Tournament appearance, where they defeated Akron in the first round before losing in the third round to Michigan.

Preseason
VCU was predicted to finish third in the Atlantic 10 preseason polls, which was released October 4, 2012 in Brooklyn, New York. Junior forward Juvonte Reddic was selected to the preseason Atlantic 10 third team, sophomore guard Brianté Weber was selected to the preseason Atlantic 10 All-Defensive team and freshman guard Melvin Johnson was selected to the preseason Atlantic 10 All-Rookie team.

2012–13 incoming team members

2012–13 team recruits

Roster

Depth chart

Offseason 
Incoming Freshman Jordan Burgess and Mo Alie-Cox were ruled ineligible to play in the 2012-13 season by NCAA because they were deemed to be partial qualifiers. Burgess was allowed to practice with the team while Alie-Cox was not.  Both were able to remain on scholarship and will be eligible to play in 2013-14 as sophomores. The school never gave specifics as to why they were ruled ineligible by the NCAA.
Guard Reco McCarver transferred from VCU to Campbell University.
Heath Houston also left the team due to knee injuries.

Regular season

Rankings

RV-Receiving votes

Schedule 

|-
!colspan=9 style="background:#; color:#;"| Exhibition

|-
!colspan=9 style="background:#; color:#;"| Non-conference regular season

	
	
	
	
	
		
	
	
	
	
		
		
		
	
|-
!colspan=12 style="background:#;"| Atlantic 10 regular season
	
		

|-
!colspan=12 style="background:#;"| Atlantic 10 tournament

|-
!colspan=12 style="background:#;"| NCAA tournament

Accolades

Honors and awards 
Sophomore guard Brianté Weber was named the Atlantic 10 Defensive Player Of The Year. Junior forward Juvonte Reddic and Sophomore guard/forward Treveon Graham were named to the Second Team All Atlantic 10. Weber and Senior guard Darius Theus were named to the Atlantic-10 All-Defensive Team. Freshman guard Melvin Johnson was named to the Atlantic 10 All-Rookie Team.

References 

VCU
VCU Rams men's basketball seasons
VCU
VCU Rams
VCU Rams